Shad Morad Mahalleh (also Romanized as Shād Morād Maḩalleh; also known as Sādāt Maḩalleh and Shāh Morād Maḩalleh) is a village in Siahkalrud Rural District, Chaboksar District, Rudsar County, Gilan Province, Iran. At the 2006 census, its population was 264, in 83 families.

References 

Populated places in Rudsar County